Daniel Pedro Martinho Teixeira (born 7 September 1998), better known as just Pedro Teixeira, is a Swiss professional footballer who plays as a midfielder for Biel-Bienne.

Professional career
Teixeira joined his local club Neuchâtel Xamax at the age of 10. After a successful debut season with Xamax in the Swiss Challenge League, Teixeira signed a 4-year contract with BSC Young Boys on 30 August 2017. Teixeira made his professional debut in a 2-1 2017–18 UEFA Europa League win over KF Skënderbeu Korçë on 7 December 2017.

He was loaned out to FC Rapperswil-Jona on 15 January 2019 for the rest of the season.

On 12 September 2019, Teixeira joined Swiss Challenge League side Kriens on a season-long loan deal.

On 19 August 2022, Teixeira moved to Biel-Bienne on a one-year contract.

International career
Teixeira was born in Switzerland to Portuguese parents, and is a one-time international for the Switzerland U19s, and most recently represented the Switzerland U20s.

References

External links
 
 FuPa Profile
 SFL Profile
 SFV Profile

1998 births
People from Neuchâtel
Sportspeople from the canton of Neuchâtel
Swiss people of Portuguese descent
Living people
Swiss men's footballers
Association football midfielders
Switzerland youth international footballers
Neuchâtel Xamax FCS players
BSC Young Boys players
FC Rapperswil-Jona players
SC Kriens players
FC Chiasso players
FC Biel-Bienne players
Swiss Super League players
Swiss Challenge League players